Farewell, Doves is a 1960 Soviet drama film directed by Yakov Segel. Film gained recognition with two international film festivals:  Locarno Film Festival in Switzerland (1961) and Melbourne International Film Festival in Australia (1962). In fact with the results of Locarno Film Festival (1961) film "Farewell, Doves" got the reward FIPRESCI from International Federation of Film Critics.

Plot 
Genka Sakhnenko studies at the school and works. But he, practically an adult and independent person, has one secret: after work, he climbs onto the dovecote. He has had a passion for pigeons since childhood. Genka is pleased with the work (he will even outwit his colleague, master Maxim Petrovich, who loves to take from tenants for work), but one day, having injured his hand, he ended up in the hospital, where he became friends with nurse Tanya. However, after a while, on the Komsomol voucher, Genka had to leave to work in another city, and he presented his pigeons to the first grader.

Cast 
 Aleksei Loktev as Genka Sakhnenko
 Valentina Telegina as Mariya Yefimovna
 Sergei Plotnikov as Maksim Petrovich
 Yevgeni Anufriyev as electrician
 Valentin Bryleev	as motorcycle buyer
 Vladimir Dibrov as Pyotr
 Leonid Gallis as Konstantin Bulatov
 Svetlana Savyolova as Tanya
 Yevgeny Kovalenko as Semyon 
 Saveliy Kramarov as Vaska

Film Shooting 
Shooting took place in Kyiv Khreschatyk Street and Maidan Nezalezhnosti (back then  Kalinin Square). Many of the scenes were filmed in Kyiv’ microdistrict Chokolivka, namely Aviaconstructor Antonov Street,  Umanska Street  and  Chokolivsky Boulevard.

References

External links 
 

1960 films
1960s Russian-language films
1960s teen drama films
1960 drama films
Soviet teen drama films